Hara Bay is a bay in Harju County, Estonia. The bay is located between Juminda and Pärispea Peninsula. The bay's area is 9859 ha.

A part of Hara Bay is under protection (Lahemaa National Park).

Two rivers flows into the bay: Valgejõgi and Lohja Stream.

References

Bays of Estonia
Harju County